Franck Dubosc (born 7 November 1963) is a French actor, comedian and stand-up artist.

Dubosc occupies 94th place in the list of the most profitable actors of French cinema.

Filmography

References

External links

1963 births
Living people
French male film actors
French male television actors
20th-century French male actors
21st-century French male actors
French humorists
French male writers
People from Le Petit-Quevilly